Nikolay Mikhailovich Kharitonov (born 30 October 1948) is a Russian politician from the Novosibirsk region. He is a leading member of the Agrarian Party of Russia, and a member of the State Duma, the Russian parliament. In 2004 he ran for the office of president of Russia in the presidential elections. His candidacy was supported by the Communist Party of the Russian Federation (CPRF). He came second, with 13.7% of the votes cast.

He is married and has four daughters.

Presidential campaign

Kharitonov was the Communist Party's nominee in the 2004 Russian presidential election. He was perceived to be a weak candidate, lacking in both name recognition and charisma. Russians were largely indifferent or unaware of his candidacy.

His campaign slogan was “For the native land and the popular will".

He spoke frequently of the virtues of Leninism.

Kharitonov also regularly made antisemitic remarks.

Kharitonov proposed re-erecting the statue of Soviet secret police founder Felix Dzerzhinsky which formerly stood in front of the Lubyanka Building until it was pulled down in 1991.

Kharitonov was strongly supported by Gennady Zyuganov. Many of Kharitonov's advertisements featured Zyuganov speaking on behalf of his candidacy. Zyuganov had originally wanted for the party to abstain from participating in the elections, however he could not coalesce the party in agreement on non-participation and ultimately supported Kharitonov. Some in the party had hoped that Kharitonov would withdraw during the course of the election campaign in order to protests what the party considered to be the "undemocratic nature" of the election.

Putin's camp believed that Kharitonov's candidacy benefited their cause by helping to increase turnout and weakening Sergey Glazyev's vote share.

The Communist Party had been besieged by fierce opposition ads during the preceding legislative election in 2003. However, Kharitonov  escaped similar opposition ads, as Putin's campaign did not see him as much of a threat.

At one point Kharitonov threatened to drop out of the race if he did not receive live coverage for one of his speeches just as Putin had for his Moscow State University address. After this, the RTR television network agreed to broadcast live coverage of a speech Kharitonov gave to his supporters in Tula on March 4.

He is one of the 324 members of the State Duma the United States Treasury sanctioned on 24 March 2022 in response to the 2022 Russian invasion of Ukraine.

References

1948 births
Living people
Communist Party of the Russian Federation members
Communist Party of the Soviet Union members
Agrarian Party of Russia politicians
Kharitonov
Kharitonov
21st-century Russian politicians
First convocation members of the State Duma (Russian Federation)
Second convocation members of the State Duma (Russian Federation)
Third convocation members of the State Duma (Russian Federation)
Fourth convocation members of the State Duma (Russian Federation)
Fifth convocation members of the State Duma (Russian Federation)
Sixth convocation members of the State Duma (Russian Federation)
Seventh convocation members of the State Duma (Russian Federation)
Eighth convocation members of the State Duma (Russian Federation)
Russian individuals subject to European Union sanctions
Russian individuals subject to the U.S. Department of the Treasury sanctions
Russian Presidential Academy of National Economy and Public Administration alumni